Huang Chin-chun (黃金椿, Pinyin: Huáng Jīn-chūn; born 5 February 1940) is a Taiwanese judoka. He competed in the men's middleweight event at the 1964 Summer Olympics.

References

1940 births
Living people
Taiwanese male judoka
Olympic judoka of Taiwan
Judoka at the 1964 Summer Olympics
Place of birth missing (living people)